Love Jones (stylized as love jones) is a 1997 American romantic comedy-drama film written and directed by Theodore Witcher, in his feature film directing debut. The film stars Larenz Tate, Nia Long, Isaiah Washington, Bill Bellamy, and Lisa Nicole Carson.

Two of the poems recited by Nia Long's character, Nina, were written by Sonia Sanchez and are included in her book Like the Singing Coming Off the Drums: Love Poems.

Love Jones had its world premiere at the Sundance Film Festival on January 17, 1997, and was released in the United States on March 14, 1997, by New Line Cinema. Although the film received favorable critical reviews, it was not a financial success. It is Theodore Witcher's only directorial work to date.

Plot

In Chicago, Darius Lovehall is a poet who is giving a reading at the Sanctuary, an upscale nightclub presenting jazz and poetry to a bohemian clientele. Shortly before his set, he meets Nina Mosley, a gifted photographer. They exchange small talk, and Darius makes his interest clear when he retitles his love poem "A Blues For Nina". A mutual attraction is sparked between them. Darius runs into Nina for the second time at the record store and asked her out for  drinks. Nina told him it was bad timing, but Darius was not taking no for an answer. He talks his friend Sheila into letting him copy Nina's address from the check she wrote, goes to another record store to get the CD she was looking for and then shows up at her place unexpectedly to deliver the CD and ask her out for a second time. They have sex on the first date, but neither Darius or Nina are sure what to do next. Nina has just gotten out of a relationship and is unsure if she still cares for her old boyfriend; Darius, meanwhile, is unsure about whether or not to admit that he really cares for Nina.

Just as Darius dares to begin believing that Nina could be "the one," Nina's ex-beau Marvin invites her to join him in New York to try to work things out. After a night with Darius, Nina tells him that she is going to New York because of unfinished business. More as a test of Darius' feelings than as an earnest attempt to resolve things with Marvin, Nina leaves, only to return to find that Darius has been fooling around with another woman. At this, Nina steps out with Darius' self-satisfied buddy Hollywood, sparking a blowup between the men and a reconciliation between the lovers, which does not last, requiring yet another separation and subsequent attempt to set things right.

Cast
 Larenz Tate as Darius Lovehall
 Nia Long as Nina Mosley
 Isaiah Washington as Savon Garrison
 Lisa Nicole Carson as Josie Nichols
 Bill Bellamy as Hollywood
 Leonard Roberts as Eddie Coles
 Bernadette Speakes as Sheila Downes (as Bernadette L. Clarke)
 Khalil Kain as Marvin Cox

Production

The producers of Love Jones stated that they wanted to make a modern film about African-American life that did not use violence and recreational drugs as elements in the story.

Soundtrack

Reception
On Rotten Tomatoes, the film holds an 80% approval rating based on reviews from 20 critics, with an average rating of 6.7/10. On Metacritic it has a score of 65% based on reviews from 22 critics. Audiences surveyed by CinemaScore gave the film a grade "A" on scale of A to F.

Roger Ebert gave the film a score of three out of four stars, and expressed the view that "There is also a bow to the unconventional in the ending of his film. Many love stories contrive to get their characters together at the end. This one contrives, not to keep them apart, but to bring them to a bittersweet awareness that is above simple love. Some audience members would probably prefer a romantic embrace in the sunset, as the music swells. But Love Jones is too smart for that." He also noted on the acting: "It's hard to believe that Tate--so smooth, literate and attractive here--played the savage killer O-Dog in Menace II Society. Nia Long was Brandi, one of the girl friends, in Boyz n the Hood. Love Jones extends their range, to put it mildly".

James Berardinelli, writing for ReelReviews, also awarded the film three out of four stars, writing that "There are several reasons why this film works better than the common, garden-variety love story. To begin with, the setting and texture are much different than that of most mainstream romances. The culture, in which post-college African Americans mingle while pursuing careers and relationships, represents a significant change from what we're used to. The Sanctuary, the intimate Chicago nightclub where Darius and Nina meet, is rich in its eclectic, bluesy atmosphere. And Love Joness dialogue is rarely trite. When the characters open their mouths, it usually is because they have something intelligent to say, not because they're trying to fill up dead air with meaningless words".

Home media
The film was released on VHS by New Line Home Entertainment. It later received a standalone DVD release, as well as a New Line "double feature" DVD release, the latter of which also included the 1996 film A Thin Line Between Love and Hate.

A 4K restoration of the film was released on Blu-ray by the Criterion Collection on March 29, 2022.

See also

References

External links 
 
 
 love Jones: Sweet Home Chicago an essay by Danielle Amir Jackson at the Criterion Collection

1997 films
1997 independent films
1997 romantic drama films
1997 comedy-drama films
African-American films
American romantic comedy-drama films
Films set in Chicago
Films shot in Chicago
New Line Cinema films
1997 directorial debut films
1990s English-language films
1990s American films